Maharashtra Institute of Technology, Aurangabad is an Indian educational institute located in Aurangabad in the Indian state of Maharashtra. It is run by Gramodyogik Shikshan Mandal (GSM) trust. It was established in 2001. It offers various engineering and management programs.

History
Gramaudyogik Shikshan Mandal (GSM), Aurangabad, Maharashtra, India is the parent trust (Organization) that was established in 1975. 

MIT was awarded A grade from National Assessment and Accreditation Council (NAAC) in 2017 and autonomous status from University Grants Commission (UGC), New Delhi in 2020.

Accreditation 
The institute is permanently affiliated to Dr. Babasaheb Ambedkar Marathwada University (BAMU), Aurangabad, and is approved by AICTE, Delhi, and DTE Maharashtra. NAAC has accredited the institute with Grade ‘A’.

MIT received recognition under Section 2(f) and 12 (B) of the UGC Act, 1956. UGC granted it autonomous status. MIT has accreditation from the Department of Science and Industrial Research (DSIR), Ministry of Science and Technology as a Science and Industrial Research Organization (SIROs). MIT has been empaneled under Unnat Maharashtra Abhiyan, a project by the Ministry of Higher and Technical Education, Government of Maharashtra. 

MIT was selected under Unnat Bharat Abhiyan, a flagship program of Ministry of Human Resource Development (HRD). MIT is an Approved ESCO = Empaneled as Energy Service Company approved by Bureau of Energy Efficiency (BEE), Ministry of Power. MIT has developed linkages between industry, and non-government organizations.

MIT is a pioneer in establishing mutually beneficial triangular partnerships among academic institutions, industry, and government organizations. It provides solutions and works on industry research projects for GIZ, Germany, Tata Technologies, and MASSIA. MIT has an association with more than 300 companies for one-semester mandatory In-Plant Training for Business Technology final year students. MIT has recognized Ph.D. Research Centers in Mechanical Engineering and Electronics and Telecommunications affiliated to Dr. Babasaheb Ambedkar Marathwada University, Aurangabad.

Ranking
Maharashtra Institute of Technology was ranked 83 in Outlook India "Top 100 Engineering Colleges in 2018". MIT was ranked 15th in the state's best colleges

Curriculum 
Maharashtra Institute Technology (MIT), Aurangabad offers a wide range of courses for graduation and post-graduation levels in the faculty of Engineering and Technology.

Business Technology 
MIT offers B.Tech. course to students in various disciplines, along with Honors and Minors Degree programs to boost the chances of employability in
 Internet of Things
 Robotics and Automation
 3D Printing
 Artificial Intelligence and Machine Learning
 Data Science
 Electric Vehicles
 Green Technology and Sustainable Engineering

Undergraduate

References

External links
Official Website: www.mit.asia

Universities and colleges in Maharashtra
Education in Aurangabad, Maharashtra
Engineering colleges in Maharashtra